The Servicio Federal de Lucha contra el Narcotráfico (Federal Counternarcotics Service, SEFECONAR) is an Argentine intelligence agency with special police tasks closely modelled on the American DEA. It was created through the Executive Decree N° 717 of April 18, 1991, and it is currently under the jurisdiction of the Sedronar. A matter of controversy, its existence has not been acknowledged by the Menem administration.

See also
Argentine Federal Police
Argentine Federal Police Intelligence
Interior Security System
National Intelligence System
National Directorate of Criminal Intelligence

Argentine intelligence agencies